Nepenthes weda is a tropical pitcher plant native to the island of Halmahera, North Maluku, Indonesia. It is currently known only from Bukit Limber, Weda Bay (near the centre of the island), where it grows in lower montane forest on ultramafic substrates at 415–1014 m above sea level.

References

Carnivorous plants of Asia
weda
Plants described in 2015
Taxa named by Martin Cheek